The 2016 Pan American Women's Club Handball Championship was the first edition of the tournament organised by the Pan-American Team Handball Federation, and was held in Santiago, Chile 1–5 November.

Participating teams
 Ferro Carril Oeste
 Metodista São Bernardo
 Ovalle Balonmano
 CH Santiago Morning
 Deportivo San José
 Nueva Estrella
 BBC Layva
 Club Atlético Goes

Preliminary round

Group A

Group B

Knockout stage

Bracket

5–8th place bracket

5–8th place semifinals

Semifinals

Seventh place game

Fifth place game

Third place game

Final

Final standing

Awards
All-star team
Goalkeeper:  Ariadne Moreira
Right Wing:  Célia Coppi
Right Back:  Camila Barreiro
Playmaker:   Victoria Crivelli
Left Back:  Mariane Fernandes
Left Wing:  Dayane Pires da Rocha
Pivot:  Rocio Campigli

References

External links
Page of the championship on PATHF website

Pan American Women's Club Handball Championship
Pan American Women's Club Handball Championship
Pan American
Pan
Pan American